A Bachelor of Environment degree is an undergraduate degree that may refer to:

 Bachelor of Arts with a major in Environmental Studies
 Bachelor of Environmental Design
 Bachelor of Environmental Science
 Bachelor of Environmental Studies
 Bachelor of Environmental Studies and Science